Darío Gustavo Stefanatto (born 3 April 1985) is a retired Argentine footballer who played as midfielder.

References

External links
 Profile at Football.com
 Profile at Univision Futbol

1985 births
Living people
Footballers from Buenos Aires
Association football midfielders
Argentine footballers
All Boys footballers
Estudiantes de La Plata footballers
Club Atlético Alvarado players